Cyrtomium is a genus of about 35 species of ferns in the family Dryopteridaceae, subfamily Dryopteridoideae, according to the Pteridophyte Phylogeny Group classification of 2016 (PPG I). Species are native to Asia, Africa (including Madagascar), and the Pacific Ocean islands (Hawaii). It is very closely related to the genus Polystichum, with 2016 research suggesting it should be included in a clade sister to Polystichum s.s.

Species
, the Checklist of Ferns and Lycophytes of the World accepted the following species:

Cyrtomium aequibasis (C.Chr.) Ching
Cyrtomium anomophyllum (Zenker) Fraser-Jenk.
Cyrtomium atropunctatum Kurata
Cyrtomium caryotideum (Wall. ex Hook. & Grev.) C.Presl
Cyrtomium chingianum P.S.Wang
Cyrtomium confertifolium Ching & K.H.Shing
Cyrtomium conforme Ching
Cyrtomium devexiscapulae (Koidz.) Ching
Cyrtomium elongatum S.K.Wu & P.K.Lôc 
Cyrtomium falcatum (L.f.) C.Presl (Japanese holly fern or holly fern)
Cyrtomium fortunei J.Sm.
Cyrtomium grossum Christ
Cyrtomium guizhouense H.S.Kung & P.S.Wang
Cyrtomium hemionitis Christ
Cyrtomium laetevirens (Hiyama) Nakaike
Cyrtomium latifalcatum S.K.Wu & Mitsuta
Cyrtomium lonchitoides (Christ) Christ
Cyrtomium luctuosum J.P.Roux
Cyrtomium macrophyllum (Makino) Tagawa
Cyrtomium membranifolium Ching & K.H.Shing ex H.S.Kung & P.S.Wang
Cyrtomium micropterum (Kunze) Ching
Cyrtomium nephrolepioides (Christ) Copel.
Cyrtomium obliquum Ching & K.H.Shing
Cyrtomium omeiense China & Shing
Cyrtomium pachyphyllum (Rosenst.) C.Chr.
Cyrtomium pseudocaryotideum J.P.Roux
Cyrtomium serratum Ching & K.H.Shing
Cyrtomium shingianum H.S.Kung & P.S.Wang
Cyrtomium sinningense Ching & K.H.Shing
Cyrtomium taiwanianum Tagawa
Cyrtomium takusicola Tagawa
Cyrtomium tsinglingense Ching & K.H.Shing
Cyrtomium urophyllum Ching
Cyrtomium yamamotoi Tagawa
Cyrtomium yunnanense Ching

References

External links

 Little D. P. & Barrington, D. S. Abstract: Relationships of Cyrtomium and Polystichum
 List of published names in Cyrtomium (includes synonyms)
 Cyrtomium falcatum

Dryopteridaceae
Fern genera